The 1994 BYU Cougars football team represented Brigham Young University (BYU) in the 1994 NCAA Division I-A football season. The Cougars were led by 23rd-year head coach LaVell Edwards and played their home games at Cougar Stadium in Provo, Utah. BYU finished with a record of 10–3 (6–2 WAC) to finish tied for second in the Western Athletic Conference. This was the first season since 1988 that the Cougars failed to win at least a share of the WAC conference title. BYU was invited to the 1994 Copper Bowl, where they defeated Oklahoma. They were ranked 10th in the final Coaches Poll and 18th in the final AP Poll.

Schedule

Source:

Roster

1995 NFL Draft

References

BYU
BYU Cougars football seasons
Guaranteed Rate Bowl champion seasons
BYU Cougars football